The North Geneva Historic District is a set of 161 buildings and structures in Geneva, Illinois. Of those, 150 contribute to the district's historical integrity. The district was added to the National Register of Historic Places in 1979, and was slightly enlarged in 2017.

History

The North Geneva Historic District reflects the northern portion of the original settlement, which was home to many prominent early Geneva businessmen as well as the working class. It consists of the area known as the First Ward, roughly bounded by Stevens Street, the (modern day) Union Pacific Railroad on the west, W. State Street to the south, and the Fox River to the east. The west and east sides of the district exhibit architectural similarities. The district is representative of the socioeconomic status of the original settlers. Lots along the Fox River differ in shape and size. Working-class homes are moderately-sized and stylistically conservative. Most are of frame construction. Oscar and August Wilson were among the more prominent local architects, who admired Frank Lloyd Wright and incorporated Prairie School elements into their otherwise vernacular buildings. 62 of the 150 notable structures are considered to have particular historical or architectural significance. Three of Geneva's first five churches are located in the district. The district was added to the National Register of Historic Places on August 1, 1979.

Notable properties
The nomination form for the historic district singles out several properties that are particularly representative of mid- to late- 19th century architectural styles.
Hubbard–Wrate House, built c. 1848, Italianate
DeGrout House, built c. 1856, Greek Revival
202 N. Fourth Street, built c. 1915, residence for August Wilson, Prairie School
228 N. Fourth Street, built c. 1916, residence for Oscar Wilson, Prairie School
United Methodist Church, built 1874 (tower completed 1893), Romanesque Revival
Westgrath–Crary House, built 1849, built with riverstone

References

National Register of Historic Places Nomination Form: North Geneva Historic District

Geneva, Illinois
National Register of Historic Places in Kane County, Illinois
Italianate architecture in Illinois
Historic districts on the National Register of Historic Places in Illinois
Geography of Kane County, Illinois
Tourist attractions in Kane County, Illinois